Samuel José Rodrigues Caldeira (born 30 November 1985) is a Portuguese cyclist who last rode for UCI Continental team .

On 4 October 2022, he received a three-year ban by the UCI for doping.

Major results

2007
 8th Overall Vuelta a Extremadura
2010
 1st  Overall Grande Prémio Crédito Agrícola de Costa Azul
1st Stages 1 & 3
2011
 2nd Overall Grande Prémio Crédito Agrícola de Costa Azul
 3rd Overall GP Liberty Seguros
 4th Overall Volta ao Alentejo
2012
 3rd Overall Volta ao Alentejo
1st  Points classification
 9th Overall Tour of Taihu Lake
2014
 1st Stage 5 Volta ao Alentejo
2015
 4th Overall Volta ao Alentejo
1st  Points classification
 6th Overall GP Liberty Seguros
 6th Clássica Loulé
2016
 4th Vuelta a La Rioja
 7th Overall GP Liberty Seguros
 9th Overall Volta ao Alentejo
2017
 1st Stage 2 Volta a Portugal
2019
 1st Prologue Volta a Portugal
 7th Fyen Rundt

See also
 Doping in sport
 List of doping cases in cycling

References

External links

1985 births
Living people
Portuguese male cyclists
People from Faro, Portugal
Sportspeople from Faro District
Doping cases in cycling